Andrew Nicholas Duff, OBE (born 25 December 1950) is a British politician who presided over the Union of European Federalists (UEF) from 2008 to 2013. A member of the Liberal Democrats, he served as a Member of the European Parliament (MEP) for the East of England from 1999 to 2014.

Early life
He was educated at Sherborne School and St John's College, Cambridge.

Political career
He initially stood in the 1984 European Parliament election, finishing third with 22.5% of the vote. In the 1989 election he polled 8% of the vote, coming fourth, then in the 1994 election he came third with 20%. The constituencies were largely representing Cambridgeshire and at times parts of Bedfordshire.

With the electoral change to regional party-list proportional representation, he was first elected in the 1999 European Parliament election when the Liberal Democrats won 12% of the regional vote, and retained his seat in the 2004 and 2009 elections when they won 14% of the regional vote. He lost his seat in 2014 when his party took less than 7% in the region.

Between October 2008 and November 2013 Andrew Duff was president of the Union of European Federalists (UEF). On 15 September 2010 Duff together with UEF initiated the Spinelli Group, which was founded to reinvigorate the strive for federalisation of the European Union (EU). Other prominent supporters are: Jacques Delors, Daniel Cohn-Bendit, Guy Verhofstadt, Elmar Brok.

He was a City Councillor in Cambridge from 1982 to 1990 and was Vice-President of the Liberal Democrats from 1994 to 1997. At the 1992 general election he stood against the then-Prime Minister, John Major, in the Huntingdon constituency, coming in third place with 12% of the vote. In October 2007 he joined the European Council on Foreign Relations.

Honours
He was awarded an OBE for services to politics in 1997.

References

External links
Andrew Duff MEP official site
Andrew Duff profile at the European Parliament
Andrew Duff profile at the site of the Liberal Democrats
Union of European Federalists
 Letters pertaining to European Union Bill 2010

1950 births
Living people
People educated at Sherborne School
Alumni of St John's College, Cambridge
Federalism
Eurofederalism
Liberal Democrats (UK) councillors
Liberal Democrats (UK) MEPs
Officers of the Order of the British Empire
People from Birkenhead
Councillors in Cambridgeshire
MEPs for England 1999–2004
MEPs for England 2004–2009
MEPs for England 2009–2014